Stanhopea insignis is a species of orchid endemic to southern and southeastern Brazil. It is the type species of the genus Stanhopea.

References

External links 

insignis
Endemic orchids of Brazil